Isolepis lenticularis (syn. Scirpus lenticularis) is a species of flowering plant in the sedge family. It was merged within I. fluitans, but was later resurrected. It is native to Australasia. Hybridisation with I. crassiuscula is known from New Zealand.

References

lenticularis
Plants described in 1859
Flora of Australasia